The UAAP Street Dance Competition is a new annual event of the University Athletic Association of the Philippines during the closing ceremonies. This is to encourage more students to watch since less spectators attend the closing ceremonies, where players are awarded for their performance. Results of the street dance competition, together with the drum line competition, will not be added to the computation of UAAP Overall Championship.

Participants

Seniors division

Juniors division

Rules

Basic rules 
 One official team per UAAP-member university
 15-20 UAAP-eligible students
 Up to 2 substitutes 12 hours before the competition

Performance 
 Maximum routine length is 3 minutes – :15 entrance, 2:30 routine and :15 exit
 All cheer stunts and pyramids are prohibited
 All tosses are not allowed

Scoring system

Until Season 80

Performance criteria
Performance criteria is 60% of the total score.
 Creativity (10)
 Spacing, formation, staging (10)
 Showmanship (10)
 Attire (10)
 Entertainment value (10)
 Variety of styles (10)

Skills criteria
Skills criteria is 40% of the total score.
 Musicality (10)
 Timing (10)
 Execution (10)
 Difficulty of styles (10)

Season 80

Performance criteria
Performance criteria is 50% of the total score.
 Creativity (5)
 Spacing, formation, staging (10)
 Attire (5)
 Entertainment value and showmanship (10)
 Variety of styles (10)
 Overall choreography (10)

Skills criteria
Skills criteria is 50% of the total score.
 Musicality (5)
 Timing (5)
 Technique Foundation (10)
 Difficulty (10)
 Strength and Control (10)
 Execution of 4 Required Styles (10)
 At least 2 old school and 2 new school

Summary of deductions 
 Incomplete crew members upon start of the routine (1)
 Grandstanding (staying on the stage for too long (beyond 30 seconds) before and after performance) (1)
 Major fall per occurrence (unrecoverable stunt, lift or support) (1)
 Minor fall per occurrence (highly noticeable accidental error: trips, falls, stumbles) (0.5)
 Boundaries (not within the boundary lines/occurrence) (0.5)
 Music
 Not within the required time/length (1)
 Inappropriate language per occurrence (1)
 Lighting and effects
 Usage of effects and inappropriate (1)
 Steps (Lewd gestures and movement per occurrence) (1)
 Attire & props (per occurrence)
 Use of prohibited props (1)
 Tossed clothing (1)
 Used of prohibited attire (head to toe) (1)
 Tumbling violations (per occurrence) (1)
 Dance lifts/partnering violations (per occurrence) (1)

Results

Seniors' division

 Notes

Juniors' division

 Notes

Championship table

Seniors division

Juniors division

See also
UAAP Cheerdance Competition

References

Street dance
Street dance